Josée Deschênes (born August 9, 1961 in Jonquière (now Saguenay, Quebec)) is a Canadian actress from Quebec. She is most noted for her performances in the films Polygraph, for which she was a Genie Award nominee for Best Supporting Actress at the 17th Genie Awards in 1996, and Ghost Town Anthology (Répertoire des villes disparues), for which she was a Prix Iris nominee for Best Actress at the 21st Quebec Cinema Awards in 2019.

She also appeared in the films The Seat of the Soul (Le siège de l'âme), Love and Magnets (Les Aimants) and The Little Queen (La Petite Reine), and the television series Annie et ses hommes, La Petite Vie, L'Auberge du chien noir and Le Phoenix.

References

External links

1961 births
20th-century Canadian actresses
21st-century Canadian actresses
Canadian film actresses
Canadian television actresses
Actresses from Quebec
French Quebecers
People from Saguenay, Quebec
Living people